Kahathuduwa is a small town in the Colombo District of the Western Province of Sri Lanka. It has interchange to southern express way

Transportation

Kahathuduwa is located on the B84 (Colombo to Horana Road) and is situated at the second exit (Exit 2) on the E01 (Southern Expressway) and will be the beginning point of E06 (Ruwanpura Expressway), connecting Rathnapura and Pelmadulla to the national expressway network.

Public Facilities
 District Hospital Kahathuduwa
 Police Station
 Post Office

References

Suburbs of Colombo
Populated places in Western Province, Sri Lanka